Workers' Socialist Movement or Socialist Workers' Movement may refer to:

Workers' Socialist Movement (Argentina)
Workers' Socialist Movement (Bolivia)
Socialist Workers' Movement (Ireland)
Socialist Workers Movement (Mexico)
Socialist Workers Movement (Nigeria)
Workers' Socialist Movement (Puerto Rico)

Political party disambiguation pages